The Diocese of Achonry may refer to:

 Roman Catholic Diocese of Achonry
 Diocese of Tuam, Killala and Achonry (Church of Ireland)

See also
 Bishop of Achonry